is a Japanese TV presenter and announcer.

He is the main presenter on the Nippon Television Sunday morning TV topical news programme The Sunday Next. He is also the main presenter on the Tokyo Broadcasting System programme . He is a big fan of Yomiuri Giants.

References

External links
 Official agency profile 
 Nippon Television profile 

1941 births
People from Meguro
Living people
Japanese television personalities
Rikkyo University alumni